WEAI (107.1 FM) is a radio station licensed to Lynnville, Illinois, United States, serving the Jacksonville, Illinois area.  The station airs a hot adult contemporary format, and is currently owned by Jacksonville Area Radio Broadcasters Inc.

References

External links

EAI
Companies based in Morgan County, Illinois
Jacksonville, Illinois micropolitan area